Sri Adwayananda Public School, administered by Alliance Educational Foundation, is a private, English-medium school in Malakkara, Kerala, India, that conducts classes from kindergarten to twelfth standard.

About the school

Founded in 1987, now with an enrolment of over 150 children on the three campuses of kindergarten through twelfth standard, the school is non-sectarian and accommodates children from varied socio-economic and religious backgrounds. It is affiliated to the Council for the Indian School Certificate Examinations and also to the Clonlara School (USA). The school is located in Malakkara village near Chengannur, Kerala, India.

Visitors to the school remark on the joyous atmosphere and enthusiasm evident among the children and teachers. In the Lower Primary Section (ages 5 through 8), the children are free to decide which activities to attend and how to organise their own day according to their interests. By the Upper Primary Section (ages 8–11), the children are motivated towards group projects that require a longer attention span. At this time, examinations are introduced in a fun way through an "Exam Fest" where everyone can help each other. By the High School (ages 12–14) and Plus-Two (ages 15–17) sections, the children prepare for the external board examinations in tenth (ICSE)/International General Certificate of Secondary Education and twelfth (ISC)/IB Diploma Programme standards or pursue the National Institute of Open Schooling Senior Secondary Programme/Clonlara diploma that assesses children on internal examinations, daily work, and a cumulative portfolio. The school also incorporates differently-abled children through assessments who can benefit from the program.

The school’s resilient graduates have gone on to higher learning at distinguished institutions in India and abroad and on into the professional world.

Milestones
 Inauguration of School by Sri Adwayananda  (1987) 
 Described by Sir Bernard Ledwidge, Chairman of Britain Committee for UNICEF, as "the best school I have seen in all my career" (1991)
 Authored teachers’ resource books of games and activities: Up and About! (1994), Let’s Colour Our World (1995), and Educational Board Games (1997), all published by Orient Longman, Ltd.
 Invited to present teaching approach to Mikhail Gorbachev’s State of the World Forum (USA), 1997, 1999, 2000
 Received the KANFED 2000 Award for Best High School for Innovation
 First graduating class (2001)
 Rated by The Week magazine as “one of the top ten innovative schools in India” (2003)
 Rated one of the top three schools in South India by Vishukani magazine (published by Malayala Manorama) (2007)
 Association of Indian Universities recognition of Clonlara diploma offered by Sri Adwayananda Public School as equivalent to +2 stage qualification of an Indian board for admission to Indian universities (2008)
 Celebration of the 25th anniversary of the School (2012)
 Annual International Colloquium on the Teacher-Student Relationship in Education series launched in August 2013
 Partnership with Decathlon India where senior students from the school have the opportunity to attend professional workshops and internships for pro

Training Programme
Sri Adwayananda Public School provides a three-year training program in its educational approach for its own teachers where teachers gain experience on each of the respective campuses: Lower Primary, Upper Primary, High School

Notes and references

External links
 Official Website

1987 establishments in Kerala
Schools in Alappuzha district
Private schools in Kerala
Educational institutions established in 1987